The Fox & the Hounds is an album by saxophonist Eddie "Lockjaw" Davis fronting a big band recorded in 1967 for the RCA Victor label.

Reception
The Allmusic site awarded the album 3 stars.

Track listing 
 "I Wished on the Moon" (Dorothy Parker, Ralph Rainger) - 2:22
 "When Your Lover Has Gone" (Einar Aaron Swan) - 2:02
 "Born to Be Blue" (Mel Tormé, Robert Wells) - 4:17
 "People Will Say We're in Love" (Oscar Hammerstein II, Richard Rodgers) - 3:25
 "Day by Day" (Sammy Cahn, Axel Stordahl, Paul Weston) - 2:28
 "Bye Bye Blackbird" (Mort Dixon, Ray Henderson) - 2:43
 "Call Me" (Tony Hatch) - 3:24
 "This Is Always" (Mack Gordon, Harry Warren) - 3:26
 "I Remember You" (Johnny Mercer, Victor Schertzinger) - 3:08
 "Out of Nowhere" (Johnny Green, Edward Heyman) - 2:08

Personnel 
 Eddie "Lockjaw" Davis - tenor saxophone
 Unnamed Big Band arranged by Bobby Plater

References 

Eddie "Lockjaw" Davis albums
1967 albums
RCA Victor albums